The Amway River Bank Run is an annual road running race hosted by Amway in U.S. city of Grand Rapids, Michigan, in the month of May. The 25K run was created and first held in 1978 by Old Kent Bank as the Old Kent River Bank Run and continued under that name until 2000, when its name was changed to the Fifth Third River Bank Run. The name of the race changed again in late 2018 when Amyway agreed to take over primary sponsorship of the race from Fifth Third Bank.

Today, the race draws over 22,000 participants from around the world. It features the largest 25K road race in the country, and is the site for the USA 25 km Open and Masters Championships. The event also features the only 25K Wheelchair Racing division in the world.

Events

25K Run
The USA 25 km Open and Masters Championships is open to U.S. citizens 14 years of age or older as of race day. The course is a USATF certified loop course which starts in downtown Grand Rapids and leaves the city going south, taking the runners through parks and along the Grand River before finishing back downtown.

Race within the race
2015 saw the introduction of the "race within the race" for the 25K. The Elite and USATF women are given an 11 minute, 30 second head start over the men. The first person to cross the finish line wins an additional prize.

25K Wheel/handcycle 
The Wheel/Handcycle Division follows the same course as the 25K run. Eligible participants have a physical disability which prohibits them from running the event. Race organizers state, "The race is for competitive cyclist only, this division is not designed for leisure racing."

10k Run 
This race is open to participants of any age who feel they can safely finish the race. The course is a USATF certified loop course which heads southwest from downtown Grand Rapids to John Ball Park and returns downtown to finish.

5K Run 
This race is open to participants of any age who feel they can safely finish the race. The course is a USATF certified loop course which takes the participants through downtown Grand Rapids.

5K Walk 
This race is open to participants of any age who feel they can safely finish the race. The participants follow the same course as the 5K run; they are not timed and awards are not given out.

Junior 
Fifth Third Junior event takes place the Wednesday before the main event at Rogers High School in Wyoming, Michigan. More than 1,700 kids between the ages of 5-13 participate in the 1/2 mile and 1 mile fun runs and 5K Run.

Classes and divisions

Clydesdale Division 
Participants in the 25K, 10K, and 5K runs may choose to register in the Clydesdale Division, which divides them into either Class A or Class B by weight. Trophies for each race awarded to the top performers in each weight class in each division. Medals are awarded to the top three performers in each weight class in each division.

Age divisions
Participants in each race are divided into male and female divisions based on age: 13 and under (not available in 25K), 14-19, 20-24, 25-29,30-34, 35-39, 40-44, 45-49, 50-54, 55-59, 60-64, 65-69, 70-74, 75-79 and 80+. The number of awards is three deep in each age division though some 25K divisions may issue fewer due to a reduced number of participants.

Sponsorship 
The primary sponsor for the event is Amway, who announced the change in sponsorship on October 10, 2018. The race was originally sponsored by Old Kent Bank and was held under the title "The Old Kent River Bank Run" until 2000 when Old Kent Bank was acquired by Fifth Third Bank. At that time, the name of the race changed but sponsorship was uninterrupted. A local rehabilitation center, Mary Free Bed Rehabilitation Hospital provides sponsorship for the Wheelchair and Handchair Divisions. Other sponsors include Metro Health Hospital, Gatorade, Pepsi, Gazelle Sports, Comcast, Meijer, and others.

Past 25K winners
Key:

References

List of winners
Post, Marty (2011-05-18). River Bank 25 km. Association of Road Racing Statisticians. Retrieved on 2019-12-31.

External links
 Official website

Road running competitions in the United States
Recurring sporting events established in 1978
Sports in Grand Rapids, Michigan
Track and field in Michigan
1978 establishments in Michigan
25K runs